Kenneth James Coleman (born 20 September 1982) is an Irish former footballer who played in the Football League for Wolverhampton Wanderers, and Kidderminster Harriers.

References

External links
 Kenny Coleman stats at Neil Brown stat site

1982 births
Living people
Republic of Ireland association footballers
English Football League players
Wolverhampton Wanderers F.C. players
Kidderminster Harriers F.C. players
Waterford F.C. players
Sportspeople from Cork (city)
Association football defenders